The 2012 Guernsey general election was held on 18 April 2012 to elect 45 members of the States of Guernsey. 78 candidates stood for the 45 seats. A total of 29,745 people, or about two-thirds of the population of Guernsey and Herm, registered to vote. There were 20,459 voters, with 81 blank papers and 65 spoilt papers, amended to 71 blank and 72 spoilt after the two recounts. Only five women were elected in 2012.

There was a by-election in December 2015 to fill a vacancy in the district of St Peter Port North.

Results 
Election results

Castel

South East

St Peter Port North

St Peter Port South

St Sampson

Vale

West

See also
 Politics of Guernsey
 Elections in Guernsey

References

External links
 
 

Elections in Guernsey
2012 elections in Europe
General election
April 2012 events in Europe